Right Back is the debut album by Long Beach Dub Allstars, released September 28, 1999 through DreamWorks Records. It was followed up by the album Wonders of the World in 2001.

"Saw Red" is a cover of a Barrington Levy song, "She's Mine".

Track listing

Guest artists
This album features many additional artists, including:
 Barrington Levy, performing on "Righteous Dub" & "Saw Red"
 H.R., performing on "New Sun"
 Dangr, performing on "Kick Down"
 Tippa Irie, performing on "Sensi"
 Half-Pint, performing on "Pass It On"
 Fletcher Dragge, guitarist of Pennywise (band), performing on "My Own Life"

Credits
Eric Wilson: bass
Bud Gaugh: drums
Marshall Goodman: drums on 6, 7, 10, and 11, turntables, percussion, and programming
Opie Ortiz: lead vocals on 3, 6, 7, and 11
RAS-1: electric guitars, and lead vocals on 2, 4, 7, and 9
Jack Maness: keyboards, organ, and background vocals
Tim Wu: sax and flute
Mixed by: Miguel, Eddie Ashworth, and Field Marshall
Engineered by: Eddie Ashworth and Miguel Engineers:  Rob "Smokey" Soto, and Jessy Moss
Production Assistant: Jessica Sickle  So songs tracked at Record 2, Mendocino, California  
Mastered by Eddy Shreyer at Oasis
Layout: Opie Ortiz and Donald Stodden
Artwork: Opie Ortiz and Joe Salamanca
Art Coordination: Mary Fagot
Management: Jon Phillips at Silverback Management
Executive Producers: Floyd Gaugh IV, Michael Happoldt, and Eric Wilson

References

1999 debut albums
Long Beach Dub Allstars albums
DreamWorks Records albums
Albums produced by Eddie Ashworth
Albums recorded at Long View Farm